The Peruvian version of El show de los sueños (The show of dreams), whose creation is due to Rubén Galindo Jr. and Santiago Galindo, premiered in 2009, hosted by Gisela Valcárcel. The programs, which according to the format are called "galas" will be transmitted on Saturdays at 10 pm (UTC-5) on América Televisión live from the studios.

Concept and schedule
El Show de los sueños (Peru) is the joint adaptation of the formats "Dancing for a Dream" and "Singing for a Dream". The reality show is a contest between teams, each consisting of 2 and 1 famous dreamers who compete in the contest of song and dance set to earn $1 million for a special cause chosen by each team. According to the original format (originally issued in Mexico) it occurs in two seasons, "Blood of my Blood" and "Friends of the Soul". In the first teams are made up of members of one family and in the second season, dreamers are part of a group of friends, all eager to find a common dream. Finally, after these two seasons the third called "Kings of the Show", in which only the finalists of the first and the second season compete. Week, the teams demonstrated their skills in the 2 disciplines and are judged by juries 8 (4 of 4 dancing and singing). The final result of the two disciplines are combined, and 2 couples with the lowest score are 'ruling' and then spends a couple to be eliminated.

First Season
The first season of "El show de los sueños" was launched on Saturday, May 23, 2009. The show has an average of 48 rating points.

Judges
The program has two judges group of three members each. One jury will evaluate the performance in singing and the other, performances of dance. The scores awarded by the jury are final.

Singing Judges
Cecilia Bracamonte (Singer)
Fabrizio Aguilar (Film director)
Andrés Arriaza (Singing teacher)

Dance Judges
Morella Petrozzi (professional dancer)
Carlos Alcántara (Actor and the winner of the first season of Bailando por un sueño (Perú))
Pachi Valle Riestra (professional dancer)

Second season

References

2009 Peruvian television series debuts
Panamericana Televisión original programming
Peruvian reality television series